Sir Ove Nyquist Arup, CBE, MICE, MIStructE, FCIOB (16 April 1895 – 5 February 1988) was an English engineer who founded Arup Group Limited, a multinational corporation that offers engineering, design, planning, project management, and consulting services for building systems. Ove Arup is considered to be among the foremost architectural structural engineers of his time.

Personal life and education
Arup was born in Newcastle, England, in 1895, to the Danish veterinary surgeon Jens Simon Johannes Arup and his Norwegian wife, Mathilde Bolette Nyquist.

Arup attended the Sorø Academy in Denmark, a boarding school with many influences from Thomas Arnold of the Rugby School in the United Kingdom.

In 1913, he began studying philosophy at University of Copenhagen and in 1918 enrolled for an engineering degree at the Technical University of Denmark, Copenhagen, specialising in reinforced concrete. He completed his studies in 1922. At this time Ove Arup was influenced by Le Corbusier and his publication Vers une architecture, published that year; and also by Walter Gropius, the founder of the Bauhaus movement.

Arup married Ruth Sørensen, known as Li, on 13 August 1925.

Working life

Before WWII
In 1922, Ove Arup began work with a Danish firm in Hamburg called Christiani & Nielsen, and in December 1923 he moved to their London office as chief engineer.

He designed the Labworth Café—a café with two integrated shelters set on the promenade of the neighbouring Essex seaside resort of Canvey Island. The café exists as the only building solely designed by Arup.

He then worked as a structural consultant to the Tecton partnership, notably on the Penguin Pool at London's Regent's Park Zoo, Whipsnade Zoo, Dudley Zoo, as a construction supervisor for a villa in Heath Drive, Romford, Essex and on Highpoint I, Highgate (a building he was later highly critical of). The close working relationship that Arup developed with Tecton's senior partner Berthold Lubetkin, proved to be highly important in the development of both men's careers.

He moved next to a London construction company, J. L. Kier & Co. in London, as director and chief designer from 1934 to 1938, and during the 1930s he also worked with Ernő Goldfinger, Wells Coates, Maxwell Fry, Yorke, Rosenberg & Mardall and Marcel Breuer.

He became a member of the executive committee of the MARS Group in 1935. In 1938, he and his cousin Arne founded Arup & Arup Limited, a firm of engineers and contractors.

World War II

Before the war, Ove Arup was on the Air Raid Precautions organising committee and he advised Finsbury Council on the provision of bomb shelters. During the war he published a number of papers on shelter policy and designs, mainly advocating reinforced concrete mass shelters, rather than the government policy of dispersing the population in small domestic shelters. Largely for political reasons most of his recommendations were never adopted, although some wealthy Londoners were able to build concrete shelters according to his design.

Arup played a significant part in the design of the Mulberry temporary harbours used during the D-Day landings.
The Mulberry Harbour was a type of temporary harbour developed to offload cargo on the beaches during the Allied invasion of Normandy. The sections for two prefabricated or artificial military harbours were taken with the invading army from Britain across the English Channel and assembled off the coast of Normandy as part of the D-Day invasion of France in 1944.

Arup & Partners

In 1946, after dissolving Arup & Arup Ltd, he created a team of Civil and Structural Engineering consultants. In the same year, he formed his first partnership with Ronald Jenkins, Geoffrey Wood and Andrew Young called Arup and Partners.

A further company, Arup Associates, was formed in 1963 as a new partnership, a body of Architects and Engineers working on an equal basis as Building Designers: the engineer Ove Arup, the architects Francis Pym and Philip Dowson, and the former partners of Arup and Partners. It was a multi-disciplinary company providing engineering, architectural, and other services for the built environment. Arup said himself that ultimately, all of the Arup names resulted in a firm called simply Arup.

Notable projects

Highpoint I
Highpoint I, built in 1935, was an important experiment in high-rise residential design, and was one of Arup's most significant collaborations with Lubetkin. Arup later criticised the project as having significant flaws.

Kingsgate Bridge

Ove Arup personally supervised the design and construction of Durham's Kingsgate Bridge in 1963. The firm's first bridge, Arup was particularly attached to the project and had his ashes scattered from it following his death. A bust of Arup that was placed at one end of the Bridge was stolen in the summer of 2006 but has since been replaced. Kingsgate Bridge was the last structure designed by Arup.

Van Ginkel Footbridge

The mid-century Van Ginkel Footbridge is in Bowring Park, St. John's, Newfoundland and Labrador, Canada. It is a cantilever bridge, meaning it is anchored to the ground on only one end while the other side hovers. The bridge received heritage designation in 2020. The architect of the bridge was Blanche Lemco van Ginkel, who received the Royal Architectural Institute of Canada's gold medal for lifetime achievement.

Sydney Opera House
Arup was the design engineer for the Sydney Opera House in Sydney, Australia from the project's start in 1957 to its completion in 1973. An iconic building making groundbreaking use of precast concrete, structural glue and computer analysis, this made Arup's reputation, and that of his firm, despite the extremely difficult working relationship with the architect, Jørn Utzon.

Honours
 1953 Commander of the Order of the British Empire (CBE)
 1965 Knight First Class of the Order of the Dannebrog
 1966 Royal Gold Medal of the Royal Institute of British Architects
 1971 British Knighthood
 1973 Gold Medal of the Institution of Structural Engineers
 1975 Knight Commander First Class of the Order of the Dannebrog
 1976 Honorary Doctorate from Heriot-Watt University
 1987 Royal Academician

Notes

References
 
 Brawne, Michael. (1983). Arup Associates: The biography of an architectural practice. London: Lund Humphries.  (casebound)  (paperback)
 Bettley, James. (2008). Essex Explored: Essex Architecture.  Essex County Council. Retrieved 2008-06-17.
 
 English Heritage. (2007). National Monuments Records: Images of England. Detailed Record, Details for IoE Number: 461758. Retrieved: 2008-02-18.
 Glynn, Simon. (1998–2006). Penguin Pool London Zoo by Berthold Lubetkin. Galinsky. Retrieved 2008-06-17.

Further reading
 Churchill Archives Centre, The Papers of Sir Ove Arup, ARUP.

External links

Twentieth Century Society: article on Dudley Zoo

 
English people of Norwegian descent
IStructE Gold Medal winners
Recipients of the Royal Gold Medal
1895 births
1988 deaths
English people of Danish descent
Commanders of the Order of the British Empire
British structural engineers
Knights Bachelor
People from Newcastle upon Tyne
Royal Academicians
University of Copenhagen alumni
20th-century Danish engineers
Ove Arup
20th-century British engineers